Joseph Cassar is the name of:

Joseph Cassar (diplomat) (died 2018), Maltese diplomat
Joseph Cassar (politician) (1918–2001), Maltese politician
Joe Cassar (born 1966), Maltese politician